The Dulce River (in Spanish Río Dulce, in Quechua Misky Mayu) is the most important river in the Argentine province of Santiago del Estero.

The Dulce River's source is in Tucumán Province under the name of Salí River, though it receives tributaries from Salta Province, and changes names when reaching Santiago del Estero.

There is also a dam in the limit with Tucumán Province called Río Hondo dam, with a lake formatted with the connection of four rivers of Tucumán. This lake is experiencing pollution due to the lack of control of the emissions of polluting substances into the Salí River, caused mainly by the pulpmills located in Tucumán.

The river runs through the Argentine Espinal ecoregion.
It is the main source of water for irrigation for the arid lands of Santiago del Estero. The Los Quiroga Dam in the northwest, finished in 1956, provides water for that area, but has produced a decrease in the precipitations of the southeastern part of the province.

References 

Rivers of Argentina
Rivers of Santiago del Estero Province
Ramsar sites in Argentina